Walter Murray may refer to:
Walter Charles Murray, president of the University of Saskatchewan, 1908–1937
Walter Murray Collegiate, high school in Saskatoon, Saskatchewan, Canada
Walter J. C. Murray, British nature writer and photographer
Walter Murray (gridiron football), American football player
Walter Murray (governor), governor of Västmanland County, Sweden, 1916–1937
Walter Murray (Quebec colonial politician) ( 1701-1772)
Walter Murray (chemist) (1871–1949) Scottish chemist
Walter Murray (printer, lawyer) (1826–1875), involved in the Rancho San Juan Capistrano Murders